The Men may refer to:

Film and TV
The Men (1950 film), a 1950 film directed by Fred Zinnemann
The Men (1971 film), a 1971 film directed by Gilles Carle
The Men (TV series), a US television series

Art 

 The Men (statue), a public artwork in Yerevan, Armenia

Music
 The Men (Human League pseudonym), an alias used by English band The Human League for 1979 release "I Don't Depend on You"
The Men (pop rock band), a defunct American band from Santa Monica, California 1990s, or their 1992 self-titled album
The Men (punk band), an active American punk rock band from Brooklyn, New York
MEN (band), an unrelated electropop band also from Brooklyn, New York

See also
Men (disambiguation)
Man (disambiguation)
The Man (disambiguation)